Noongarpedia is a collaborative project to add Noongar language content to Wikimedia projects and to improve all languages' content relating to Noongar topics. It is being driven by an Australian Research Council project from the University of Western Australia and Curtin University, in collaboration with Wikimedia Australia.  The goal of the project is to establish a Noongar language Wikipedia.

See also

Freopedia

References

Further reading

External links
 Noongarpedia on Meta-Wiki

Noongar language
Wikimedia projects
Wikimedia Australia in Western Australia